The Bacardi Cup is one of the oldest and most traditional sailing events in the world.

What started out as a three-day event with less than 10 boats in 1927, now attracts more than 200 sailors each year from some 23 countries and the attention of international media.

The Bacardi Cup is legendary as one of the few sporting events in which weekend enthusiasts have the opportunity to compete head on with Olympian and World Champion athletes.

The tradition of camaraderie and competition surrounding the Trofeo BACARDI began in Havana, Cuba where it was first sailed as part of the Mid-Winter Championship known as the Cup of Cuba.

For the next 30 years the BACARDI Cup established an esteemed reputation for competition and hospitality. The tradition flourished until political unrest forced BACARDI to leave Cuba in 1957, the last year the BACARDI Cup was hosted by Cuba. It was also cancelled in 1934, during World War II from 1943-1947 and again in 1956.

In 1962, the regatta found a new home in Coconut Grove/Miami at the Coral Reef Yacht Club, where it has continued to sail from every year since. Miami native James "Ding" Schoonmaker, former World Champion and seven-time BACARDI Cup winner, and Frank Zagarino, 1969 Bacardi Cup winner, are credited with making the transition work. Ding won his first BACARDI Cup in Havana at the age of 19. In 2004, the Portuguese team of Afonso Domingos and Bernardo Santos was the first European team to win this prestigious sailing regatta. They won again in 2008.

In 2007, teams from China and Croatia competed in the BACARDI Cup for the first time. In 2008, Hungarian and Russian teams were on the start line for the first time joining teams from 24 other countries. 2008 was a BACARDI Cup history first with almost three quarters of the fleet from countries other than the United States.

The BACARDI Cup is the only Cuban-born sporting event to survive in the United States and it is sponsored in full by Bacardi U.S.A., Inc.

Winners

1927 –  Adrian Iselin II & Ed Willis
1928 –  F. Robinson & D. Robinson
1929 –  Fred Bedford & Briggs Cunningham
1930 –  W. F. Teves
1931 –  Carlos de Cárdenas
1932 –  David Atwater & Charles Lawton
1933 –  Adrian Iselin II & Elwood White
1934 – not held
1935 –  Adrian Iselin II & Sr. Carricabura
1936 –  Adrian Iselin II & Elwood White
1937 –  Paul Shields & Corny Shields
1938 –  Harry Gale Nye, Jr.
1939 –  Paul Smart
1940 –  Harry Gale Nye, Jr.
1941 –  Harry Gale Nye, Jr.
1942 –  Alfred de Marigny
1948 –  Lockwood Pirie & Sam Pirie
1949 –  Lockwood Pirie & F. S. Dixon
1950 –  E. W. Etchells & Mary Etchells
1951 –  Durward Knowles & Ding Schoonmaker
1952 –  Robert Lippincott & Bob Levine
1953 –  Ding Schoonmaker & Donald Pritchard
1954 –  Alberto Reyes & José de la Campa
1955 –  Jorge de Cárdenas & Alvaro de Cárdenas
1957 –  Alvaro de Cárdenas & Jorge de Cárdenas
1962 –  Basil Kelly & David Kelly
1963 –  Howard Lippincott & Herb Hild
1964 –  Ding Schoonmaker & Asa Colson
1965 –  Read Ruggles & David Dickey
1966 –  Joe Duplin & Rodney Long
1967 –  Richard Stearns & Lynn Williams
1968 –  Richard Stearns & Lynn Williams
1969 –  Frank Zagarino & Gould Ryder
1970 –  Ding Schoonmaker & Jörg Bruder
1971 –  Ding Schoonmaker & Jörg Bruder
1972 –  Read Ruggles & David Dickey
1973 –  Bill Buchan, Jr. & Craig Thomas
1974 –  Ding Schoonmaker & Jerry Ford
1975 –  Peter Wright & William Wright
1976 –  Ding Schoonmaker & Jerry Ford
1977 –  Ding Schoonmaker & Chris Rogers
1978 –  Peter Wright & Todd Cozzens
1979 –  Bill Buchan, Jr. & Douglas Knight
1980 –  Bill Buchan, Jr. & Douglas Knight
1981 –  Vince Brun & Todd Cozzens
1982 –  Vince Brun & Randy McLaren
1983 –  Andy Menkart & James Kavle
1984 –  Mark Reynolds & Chris Gould
1985 –  Vince Brun & Robert Billingham
1986 –  Vince Brun & Hugo Schreiner
1987 –  Vince Brun & Hugo Schreiner
1988 –  Ed Adams & Tom Olsen
1989 –  Mark Reynolds & Hal Haenel
1990 –  Mark Reynolds & Hal Haenel
1991 –  Ed Adams & George Iverson
1992 –  Mark Reynolds & Hal Haenel
1993 –  Peter Wright & Greg Cook
1994 –  Ross MacDonald & Bruce MacDonald
1995 –  Ross MacDonald & Kai Bjorn
1996 –  Vince Brun & Magnus Liljedahl
1997 –  Mark Reynolds & Magnus Liljedahl
1998 –  Mark Reynolds & Magnus Liljedahl
1999 –  Ross MacDonald & Kai Bjorn
2000 –  Ross MacDonald & Kai Bjorn
2001 –  Peter Bromby & Martin Siese
2002 –  Mark Reynolds & Magnus Liljedahl
2003 –  Peter Bromby & Martin Siese
2004 –  Afonso Domingos & Bernardo Santos
2005 –  Mark Mendelblatt & Mark Strube
2006 –  John Dane III & Austin Sperry
2007 –  Hamish Pepper & David Giles
2008 –  Afonso Domingos & Bernardo Santos
2009 –  Peter Bromby & Magnus Liljedahl
2010 –  Rick Merriman & Phil Trinter
2011 –  Guillaume Florent & Pascal Rambeau
2012 –  Xavier Rohart & Pierre-Alexis Ponsot
2013 –  Mark Mendelblatt & Brian Fatih
2014 –  Lars Grael & Samuel Goncalves
2015 –  Lars Grael & Samuel Goncalves
2016 –  Robert Stanjek & Frithjof Kleen
2017 –  Mark Mendelblatt & Magnus Liljedahl
2018 -  Diego Negri & Sergio Lambertenghi
2019 -  Eric Doyle & Payson Infelise
2020 -   Mateusz Kusznierewicz & Bruno Prada
2021 -   Mateusz Kusznierewicz & Bruno Prada
2022 -   Mateusz Kusznierewicz & Bruno Prada

References
www.bacardicup.com 
Sailing competitions in Cuba
Sailing competitions in the United States
Recurring sporting events established in 1927
Star (keelboat) competitions
Sailing in Florida